Stafne bone cavity (also known as Stafne defect or Stafne bone defect) is an asymptomatic bone depression at the lingual surface of the mandible. This bone depression is present unilaterally and contains ectopic salivary gland. It was first described as a bone defect by Edward C. Stafne in 1942. Stafne bone cavity is rare and is only present in 0.17% of the general population. This cavity is commonly observed on panoramic radiograph.

Structure 

Two classification systems were proposed to categorize Stafne bone cavity based on its depth and content. 

Various synonyms have been used to describe this bone cavity including Stafne bone defect, lingual cortical mandibular defect, lingual mandibular bone cavity and submandibular gland defect.  

The development of Stafne bone cavity is still inconclusive as several theories have been proposed. It was originally proposed by Stafne that some parts of the submandibular gland could be trapped during mandibular ossification, causing well-circumscribed bony depression. This theory is supported by the observation that ectopic salivary glands are found in the cavity. Another hypothesis states that this bone cavity could result from the pressure exerted on the inner surface of the mandible due to the growth of sublingual or submandibular gland.

Additional images

See also 

 List of anatomical variation

References 

Anatomical variations
Human anatomy
Congenital disorders of musculoskeletal system